The Finance functional constituency, formerly called the Financial functional constituency, is a functional constituency in the elections for the Legislative Council of Hong Kong first created in 1985. It was one of the 12 original functional constituency seats created for the first ever Legislative Council election in 1985 and was divided into Finance and Financial Services in 1991. It has the fewest electorates among all constituencies, composing of 114 banks and deposit-taking companies as corporate electors.

Since its creation, it had held by David Li, chairman of the Bank of East Asia, uncontestedly with the exception of 2000 Legislative Council election which was the only election held in the constituency. Li retired from the office in 2012 and was replaced by Ng Leung-sing. Since 2016, it has been represented by Chan Chun-ying, the former board secretary of the state-owned Bank of China (Hong Kong).

Return members

Financial (1985–1991)

Finance (1991–present)

Electoral Results

2020s

2010s

2000s

1990s

1980s

References

Constituencies of Hong Kong
Constituencies of Hong Kong Legislative Council
Functional constituencies (Hong Kong)
1985 establishments in Hong Kong
Constituencies established in 1985